Villers-le-Château is a village and commune in the Marne département of north-eastern France.

See also
 Communes of the Marne department

References

Communes of Marne (department)